Tar is a village in Tar-Vabriga municipality in Istria County, Croatia.

References

Populated places in Istria County